The Hunt for Gollum is a 2009 British fantasy fan film based on the appendices of J. R. R. Tolkien's 1954–55 book The Lord of the Rings. The film is set in Middle-earth, when the wizard Gandalf the Grey fears that Gollum may reveal information about the One Ring to Sauron. Gandalf sends ranger Aragorn on a quest to find Gollum.

Filming took place in North Wales, Epping Forest, and Hampstead Heath. The film was shot in high definition video, with a budget of £3,000 (US$5,000). The production is completely unofficial and unauthorized, though Bouchard said he had "reached an understanding" with Tolkien Enterprises in 2009.

The Hunt for Gollum debuted at the Sci-Fi-London film festival and on the Internet, free to view, on 3 May 2009. By 20 October, it had been viewed by 5 million people, and over 15 million times by 2020.

Plot
The film is set during the timespan of The Fellowship of the Ring. It takes place 17 years after Bilbo Baggins's 111th birthday party and just before Frodo Baggins leaves the Shire for Rivendell (an interval which was not outlined in the motion picture based on that story).  The wizard Gandalf fears that Gollum may reveal information about the One Ring to the Dark Lord Sauron, and sends the Ranger Aragorn, heir of Isildur, on a quest to find him.

The story opens with a brief prologue about the ring's disappearance before cutting to Aragorn (Adrian Webster) and Gandalf (Patrick O'Connor) at an inn (presumably the Prancing Pony) in Bree. Gandalf explains his concerns about Gollum's knowledge of the Ring falling into enemy hands, and asks Aragorn to find the creature with his tracking skills. After initially having little luck, Aragorn crosses paths with a fellow ranger and distant kinsman named Arithir (Arin Alldridge), a Ranger of the North, who reports hearing rumours about a creature that has been stealing fish from open windows in local villages; the movie cuts to a scene of Gollum doing just that, and eating his ill-gotten gain atop the roof.

Aragorn and Arithir part ways, and Aragorn encounters and kills a pair of orc scouts in the forest. He soon locates Gollum by a fish pond afterwards and captures the creature in a snare trap. Having secured the whining and protesting Gollum inside a sack, Aragorn sets out for Mirkwood. On the way, he briefly spots one of the nine Ringwraiths in the woods, but avoids it. Later that same day, he is attacked by an orc squad and defeats them, but is hit by a poison dart which takes effect after he dispatches his last attacker. He collapses beside a patch of Athelas flowers and has a vision of Arwen (Rita Ramnani) in Rivendell.

Aragorn regains consciousness at dusk and discovers that Gollum has escaped from the sack. He seeks the creature well into the night, but finally finds him hiding up in a tree. Gollum fearfully explains that a Ringwraith is coming — seconds later, a Ringwraith indeed does appear and attacks Aragorn. After a short but intense duel, the Ringwraith flees from a bright light created by the Elves of Mirkwood, who recapture Gollum and guide Aragorn back to their fortress.

The scene cuts to Gandalf emerging from Mirkwood's dungeons after interrogating Gollum. Gandalf tells Aragorn that Gollum knows of Bilbo Baggins and The Shire, and explains that he must now go there to warn Frodo. Aragorn suggests sending Frodo to meet him in Bree, and Gandalf readily agrees. The film ends with Gollum speaking to himself in the dungeon, where he vows to kill "Bagginses" and reclaim his "Precious".

Cast
Adrian Webster as Aragorn II Elessar, a Dúnedain ranger, the descendant of Isildur, and heir to Gondor's throne. He travels on a journey to find Gollum. Media coverage has noted Webster's resemblance to Viggo Mortensen, who played Aragorn in The Lord of the Rings film trilogy.
Arin Alldridge as Arithir, a ranger and distant kinsman. He is an original character.
Patrick O'Connor as Gandalf the Grey, an Istari wizard. As with Webster and Mortensen, coverage has noted O'Connor's resemblance to Ian McKellen, who played Gandalf in The Lord of the Rings film trilogy.
Rita Ramnani as Arwen, an elven daughter of Elrond, lord of Rivendell, and Aragorn's true love.
Gareth Brough voices Gollum, a wretched hobbit-like creature whose mind was poisoned over centuries by the Ring; and Goblok, an orc chieftain, an original character. Jason Perino also voices Gollum, while Mathew Cunningham, Christopher Dinglias and Francesco San Juan play the character's body.
Max Bracey as a Mirkwood Elf.

Production

Principal photography

The Hunt for Gollum had a shooting budget of less than £3,000. Location filming took place in North Wales, Epping Forest and Hampstead Heath. 160 people volunteered as crew members for the production. The production design was based on Peter Jackson's Lord of the Rings films.  Director Chris Bouchard said, "Peter Jackson's individual look was a big inspiration, it's been an adventure for us to play in that world that he created." The fight scenes were "a huge technical challenge".

VFX
The VFX crew was headed by Adam Thomas while Maciej Kuciara supervised the Digital Matte works. Alban Kasikci, Brett Frame, Daren Horley, Dennis Fraser, Corey Butler, Guillaume Benamout, Ismail Kemal Ciftcioglu, Joe Kormendi, Hesam Bani-Eghbal, Kaustav Sinha, Michael James, Nick Marshall, Tiberius Viris and Vladimir Teneslav were Matte Painters. With almost 160 people down the crew list the film crew had 60 on visual effects shots for the film over the internet.

Audio
The sound mix was completed at the Futureworks studio in Manchester. The composers for The Hunt for Gollum were Adam Langston, Andrew Skrabutenas and Chris Bouchard. The soundtrack has never been released on CD. The soundtrack was released for free music download.

Legal issues

It is unclear whether the production violates the rights held by the Tolkien Estate and New Line films. Fred von Lohmann, director of the Electronic Frontier Foundation, told National Public Radio that the high quality of the film and its global reach via the internet could potentially create legal issues.

Reception

Release
The Hunt for Gollum debuted at the Sci-Fi-London film festival and on the Internet, free to view, on 3 May 2009. By 20 October 2009, it had been viewed by 10 million people. Bouchard states it has had over 15 million views (by 2020).

The Balticon Film Festival for amateur short films awarded The Hunt for Gollum their Best Live Action award in 2009.

Critical response
The film had 3 million views in the first 3 months of release and was well received. It was generally praised for being one of the best made fan films available on the internet. Shortly after its May 2009 release, it became the "fourth most watched release in the US in terms of viewing numbers".

The trailer for the film was well received online.  A blogger for Entertainment Weekly said that based on the trailer, the film "looks awesome", and added that the filmmakers "seem to have nailed a passable low-budget version of Peter Jackson's best-epic-movie-ever visuals." Similarly, a blogger for Wired News said that "The Hunt for Gollum looks pretty stunning for a film made 'by fans for fans.'" On National Public Radio's All Things Considered, reporter Laura Sydell said, "The Hunt for Gollum looks just like the Hollywood version.  I was fooled the first time I saw it. ... the special effects in the trailer are flawless." A writer for the film website Rotten Tomatoes said, "the trailers suggest it'll be better than Eragon ... or Krull".

The Tolkien scholar Robin Anne Reid wrote that "The consensus seems to be that the film is atypical of fan productions because of its professional production values" and calls it a "hybrid fan/pro film".

See also

Born of Hope

References

External links
 Official website
 
 
 The Hunt for Gollum review on Fantasy Fan
 The Hunt for Gollum review on Republibot

2009 films
2009 independent films
Fan films
Films set in Middle-earth
British independent films
Tolkien fandom
2000s English-language films
2000s British films
Films released on YouTube